Donald Black may refer to:

Donald Black (sociologist) (born 1941), American sociologist
Donald Elmer Black (1892–1980), Canadian politician, farmer and merchant
Donald Black (business executive), British businessman and accountant in Hong Kong
Donald W. Black (born 1956), American psychiatrist

See also
Don Black (disambiguation)